The 2004–05 season was the 26th season of the Football Conference, and the 1st season following its expansion from one division to three divisions.

Overview
This season saw the Conference expanded to three divisions with the addition of the Conference North and Conference South added to the existing (and renamed) Conference National. The North and South Divisions were filled by teams finishing 1st–13th in the Northern Premier League Premier Division and 2nd–13th in the Isthmian League Premier Division and Southern League Premier Division the previous season (the champions were all promoted to the Conference National), together with winners of play-offs between the 14–18th placed clubs in the Southern League Premier, 14th–20th in the Isthmian and Northern Premier League Premier, as well as the top clubs from the divisions immediately below.

The Conference National was joined by Carlisle United and York City, who had been relegated from the Football League. Carlisle became the first club to compete in all top five tiers of English football, having reached the old First Division in 1974–75.

In addition to the winners and the teams that qualified for the play-offs, Exeter City fought gallantly in the FA Cup against Manchester United, holding them to a goalless draw in the third round on Old Trafford and finally going down 0–2 on home turf.

Conference National

A total of 22 teams contest the division, including 18 sides from last season, two relegated from the Football League Two, one promoted from the Southern Football League and one promoted from the Isthmian League. Winners and runners-up of Northern Premier League were unable to qualify in Conference National.

Promotion and relegation
Teams promoted from 2003–04 Southern Football League
 Crawley Town

Teams promoted from 2003–04 Isthmian League
 Canvey Island

Teams relegated from 2003–04 Football League Third Division
 Carlisle United
 York City

League table

Locations

Results

Play-offs

Topscorers

Source:

Conference North

First Conference North/South season saw competition of best 44 teams by the results of previous season from Northern Premier League, Southern Football League and Isthmian League, except Crawley Town and Canvey Island, promoted directly to Conference National. Teams were divided by geographical criteria.

Promotion
Teams promoted from 2003–04 Northern Premier League
 Hucknall Town
 Droylsden
 Barrow
 Alfreton Town
 Harrogate Town
 Southport
 Worksop Town
 Lancaster City
 Vauxhall Motors
 Gainsborough Trinity
 Stalybridge Celtic
 Altrincham
 Runcorn F.C. Halton
 Bradford Park Avenue (Northern Premier League Premier Division playoff winners)
 Ashton United

Teams promoted from 2003–04 Southern Football League
 Stafford Rangers
 Nuneaton Borough
 Worcester City
 Hinckley United
 Moor Green
 Redditch United

Teams promoted from 2003–04 Isthmian League
 Kettering Town

League table

Locations

Results

Top scorers

Source:

Conference South

First Conference North/South season saw competition of best 44 teams by the results of previous season from Northern Premier League, Southern Football League and Isthmian League, except Crawley Town and Canvey Island, promoted directly to Conference National. Teams were divided by geographical criteria.

Promotion
Teams promoted from 2003–04 Southern Football League
 Weymouth
 Newport County
 Cambridge City
 Welling United
 Weston-super-Mare
 Eastbourne Borough
 Havant & Waterlooville
 Dorchester Town(Southern Football League Premier Division playoff winners)

Teams promoted from 2003–04 Isthmian League
 Sutton United
 Thurrock
 Hornchurch
 Grays Athletic
 Carshalton Athletic
 Hayes
 Bognor Regis Town
 Bishop's Stortford
 Maidenhead United
 Ford United
 St Albans City (Isthmian League Premier Division playoff winners)
 Lewes (Isthmian League Division One South winners, promoted through playoffs)
 Basingstoke Town (promoted after higher finished Hendon decided not to take part in Conference South)

Teams relegated from 2003–04 Football Conference
 Margate

At the start of the season Ford United was given new name Redbridge F.C.

League table

Locations

Results

Topscorers

Source:

North/South play-offs

References 

 
National League (English football) seasons
5
English